In physics, an infrared fixed point is a set of coupling constants, or other parameters, that evolve from initial values at very high energies (short distance) to fixed stable values, usually predictable, at low energies (large distance). This usually involves the use of the renormalization group, which specifically details the way parameters in a physical system (a quantum field theory) depend on the energy scale being probed.

Conversely, if the length-scale decreases and the physical parameters approach fixed values, then we have ultraviolet fixed points.  The fixed points are generally independent of the initial values of the parameters over a large range of the initial values. This is known as universality.

Statistical physics
In the statistical physics of second order phase transitions, the physical system approaches an infrared fixed point that is independent of the
initial short distance dynamics that defines the material. This determines the properties of the phase transition at the critical temperature, or  critical point. Observables, such as critical exponents usually depend only upon dimension of space, and are independent of the atomic or molecular constituents.

Top Quark

There is a remarkable infrared fixed point of the coupling constants that determine the masses of very heavy quarks. In the Standard Model, quarks and leptons have "Yukawa couplings" to the Higgs boson which determine the masses of the particles. Most of the quarks' and leptons' Yukawa couplings are small compared to the top quark's Yukawa coupling. Yukawa couplings are not constants and their properties change depending on the energy scale at which they are measured, this is known as running of the constants. The dynamics of Yukawa couplings are determined by the renormalization group equation:

,

This equation describes how the Yukawa coupling changes with energy scale .

The Yukawa couplings of the up, down, charm, strange and bottom quarks, are small at the extremely high energy scale of grand unification,  GeV.  Therefore, the  term can be neglected in the above equation. Solving, we then find that   is increased slightly at the low energy scales at which the quark masses are generated by the Higgs,  GeV.

On the other hand, solutions to this equation for large initial values  cause the rhs to quickly approach zero as we descend in energy scale which locks  to the QCD coupling . This is known as a (infrared) quasi-fixed point of the renormalization group equation for the Yukawa coupling.  No matter what the initial starting value of the coupling is, if it is sufficiently large it will reach this quasi-fixed point value, and the corresponding quark mass is predicted.

The  "infrared quasi-fixed point" was proposed in 1981 by B. Pendleton, G. G. Ross
and C. T. Hill. The prevailing view at the time was that the top quark mass would lie in a range of 15 to 26 GeV. The quasi-infrared fixed point has formed the basis of top quark condensation theories of electroweak symmetry breaking in which the Higgs boson is composite at extremely short distance scales, composed of a pair of top and anti-top quarks.

In the minimal supersymmetric extension of the Standard Model (MSSM), there are two Higgs doublets and the renormalization group equation for the top quark Yukawa coupling is slightly modified. This led to a fixed point where the top mass is smaller, 170–200 GeV. Some theorists believed this was supporting evidence for the MSSM, however no signs of any predictions of the MSSM have emerged at the Large Hadron Collider and most theorists believe the theory is now ruled out.

The value of the quasi-fixed point is determined in the Standard Model, leading to a predicted top quark mass of about 220  GeV. If there is more than one Higgs doublet, the value will be reduced by an increase in the 9/2 factor in the equation,
and any Higgs mixing angle effects.  
The observed top quark mass of 174 GeV is slightly lower
than the standard model prediction by about 20% which suggests there may be
more Higgs doublets beyond the single standard model Higgs boson.
If there are many additional Higgs doublets in nature the predicted
value of the quasi-fixed point comes into agreement with experiment.

Banks–Zaks fixed point

Another example of an infrared fixed point is the Banks–Zaks fixed point in which the coupling constant of a Yang–Mills theory evolves to a fixed value. The beta-function vanishes, and the theory possesses a symmetry known as conformal symmetry.

See also
 Top quark
 Cutoff (physics)

References

Renormalization group
Statistical mechanics
Conformal field theory
Fixed points (mathematics)